Bighorn Dam (or Bighorn Hydro Plant) is an embankment dam located in Clearwater County in west-central Alberta, Canada. It was built by Calgary Power in 1972, and led to the creation of Lake Abraham, Alberta's largest reservoir. The dam and associated hydroelectric plant are managed by TransAlta.

Planning of the dam involved no evaluation of the social and environmental effects it may have caused, and no public hearings were held prior to the construction either. The construction of the Bighorn dam flooded the Kootenay Plains and stopped the livelihood (hunting and fur trapping) of the Bighorn Stoney Indigenous that had lived in that area.  It had flooded their cabins, graves and pastures.

The Bighorn Plant is the second largest hydro facility owned by TransAlta (the largest being Brazeau Dam), with a capacity of 120 megawatts (MW). However, it has an available water supply that allows it to be the largest producer of hydroelectric energy in Alberta, with an average of  each year.

The plant is one of two TransAlta hydroelectric plants on the North Saskatchewan River system in Alberta.

The dam was built in 1972 in the mountain gap at Windy Point, in the Front Ranges of the Canadian Rockies, west of the confluence of the North Saskatchewan River and the Bighorn River.

Climate

References

Clearwater County, Alberta
Dams in Alberta
Hydroelectric power stations in Alberta
1972 establishments in Alberta
North Saskatchewan River
Dams completed in 1972
Dams in the Saskatchewan River basin